The Yangzhou massacre in May, 1645 in Yangzhou, Qing dynasty China, refers to the mass killings of innocent civilians by Manchu and defected northern Ming soldiers, commanded by the Manchu general Dodo.

The massacre is described in a contemporary account, A Record of Ten Days in Yangzhou, by Wang Xiuchu.  Due to the title of the account, the events are often referred to as a ten-day massacre, but the diary shows that the slaughter was over by the sixth day, when burial of bodies commenced.   According to Wang, the number of victims exceeded 800,000, that number is now disproven and considered by modern historians and researchers to be an extreme exaggeration. The major defending commanders of Ming, such as Shi Kefa, were also executed by Qing forces after they refused to submit to Qing authority.

The alleged reasons for the massacre were:
 To punish the residents because of resistance efforts led by the Ming official Shi Kefa.
 To warn the rest of the population in Jiangnan of the consequences of participating in military activities and resisting the Qing invaders.

Wang Xiuchu's account has appeared in a number of English translations, including by Backhouse and Bland, Lucien Mao, and Lynn A. Struve.  Following are excerpts from the account in the translation by Struve.

Books written about the massacres in Yangzhou, Jiading and Jiangyin were later republished by anti-Qing authors to win support in the leadup to the Taiping Rebellion and Xinhai Revolution.

Manchu soldiers ransomed women captured from Yangzhou back to their original husbands and fathers in Nanjing after Nanjing peacefully surrendered, corralling the women into the city and whipping them hard, with their hair containing a tag showing the price of the ransom.

See also
Anti-Qing sentiment

References

Literature
Struve, Lynn A., Voices from the Ming-Qing Cataclysm: China in Tigers' Jaws,  Publisher:Yale University Press, 1998, See pp. 32–48 for the translation of Wang Xiuchu's account.
Finnane, Antonia, Speaking of Yangzhou: A Chinese City, 1550-1850, Cambridge: Harvard University Asia Center, 2004. See especially Chapter 4, "Yangzhou's Ten Days."
Wei, Minghua 伟明铧, 1994. “Shuo Ýangzhou shiri’”说扬州十日, in Wei Minghua, Yangzhou tanpian 扬州谈片 Beijing: Sanlian shudian.
Zarrow, Peter, 2004. “Historical Trauma: Anti-Manchuism and Memories of Atrocity in Late Qing China,”  History and Memory, Vol. 16, No. 2, Special Issue: Traumatic Memory in Chinese History.
The Litigation Master and the Monkey King, Liu, Ken. In The Paper Menagerie and other stories. Publisher:Saga Press, 2016, . pages 363–388.

Qing dynasty
History of Jiangsu
Conflicts in 1645
Massacres in China
17th century in China
1645 in China
War crimes in China
Massacres in 1645